This is a list of numbered county roads in Prince Edward County, Ontario.

Renfrew